The yellow-bellied fantail (Chelidorhynx hypoxanthus), also known as the yellow-bellied fairy-fantail, is found in the Indian subcontinent, the Himalayas, and portions of Southeast Asia including Thailand, Vietnam, and Myanmar.  It is about 8 cm in size.  It is yellow below and has a black eye-stripe, white wing-bar and broad black tail tipped white.

It used to be placed in the family of the fantails (Rhipiduridae), but DNA analysis has shown it to be a close relative of the fairy flycatcher and it has therefore been transferred to the Stenostiridae (IOC World Bird List), in the revalidated monotypic genus Chelidorhynx.

References

External links
 Image at ADW

yellow-bellied fantail
Birds of the Himalayas
Birds of Laos
Birds of Myanmar
Birds of Northeast India
Birds of Tibet
Birds of Yunnan
yellow-bellied fantail
yellow-bellied fantail